Republican Action (AR) was a Spanish left-wing republican party between 1930 and 1934.

History
The AR was founded in 1925 under the name Acción Política ("Political Action") by Manuel Azaña and José Giral. Political Action became a political party in 1930 under the name Republican Action. The party was anticlerical, and supported decentralization, agrarian reform and military reform.

As a member of the Republican Alliance, the AR was a signatory of the Pact of San Sebastián to overthrow the monarchy of Alfonso XIII and was later involved in the construction and consolidation of the Second Spanish Republic. It was a member of the provisional government which governed Spain after the King fled in April 1931.

The party's left-wing faction, led by Marcelino Domingo split off from the party to form the Radical Socialist Republican Party in 1931.

The party won 30 seats in the 1931 election and soon became, despite its small size, an integral part of governments until 1933 notably under its leader Manuel Azaña. After the defeat of the left in the 1933 election, during which the AR won only 10 seats, it merged with the Autonomous Galician Republican Organization (ORGA) and Domingo's Radical Socialist Republican Party in 1934 to form the Republican Left (Izquierda Republicana).

The AR was a typical leftwing liberal party. It attracted the support of the small bourgeoisie, like teachers, lawyers and shopkeepers.

AR Ministers
Manuel Azaña
José Giral
Claudio Sánchez-Albornoz y Menduiña

Election results

References

Bibliography
 Barrio Alonso, Ángeles (2004). La modernización de España (1917-1939). Política y sociedad. Madrid: Síntesis. .
 González Calleja, Eduardo (2005). La España de Primo de Rivera. La modernización autoritaria 1923-1930. Madrid: Alianza Editorial. .
 Juliá, Santos (2009). La Constitución de 1931. Madrid: Iustel. .

Political parties established in 1926
Defunct political parties in Spain
Liberal parties in Spain
20th century in Spain
Radical parties
Republican parties in Spain
Political parties disestablished in 1934